Nizhny (Tübänge) is a rural locality (a khutor) in Shingak-Kulsky Selsoviet, Chishminsky District, Bashkortostan, Russia. The population was 188 as of 2010. There are 2 streets.

Geography 
Nizhny is located 36 km southwest of Chishmy (the district's administrative centre) by road. Yekaterinoslavka is the nearest rural locality.

References 

Rural localities in Chishminsky District